Ross McKinnon (born 9 October 1992) is a Scottish footballer who plays as a defender for Elgin City. McKinnon has previously played for Motherwell, Clyde, East Kilbride and BSC Glasgow, as well as Dumbarton and Alloa Athletic on loan.

His uncle Rob McKinnon is also a former footballer who played as a defender, primarily for Hartlepool United and Motherwell.
Now a firefighter for Scottish Fire and Rescue Service since 2018 responding out of Springburn Community Fire Station

References

External links

1992 births
Scottish footballers
Living people
Motherwell F.C. players
Dumbarton F.C. players
Alloa Athletic F.C. players
Elgin City F.C. players
Clyde F.C. players
East Kilbride F.C. players
Broomhill F.C. (Scotland) players
Scottish Football League players
Lowland Football League players
Association football defenders